4th Uchastok is a rural locality (a settlement) in Dmitrov Urban Settlement of Dmitrovsky District, Moscow Oblast, Russia. The population was 0 as of 2010. It had a population of 6 in 2002 and 2006.

Geography 
4th Uchastok is located 25 km south of Kargasok (the district's administrative centre) by road. 3rd Uchastok is the nearest rural locality.

Streets 
There are no named streets.

References 

Rural localities in Dmitrovsky District, Moscow Oblast